Tri Češmi is a village in the municipality of Štip, North Macedonia.

Demographics
According to the 2002 census, the village had a total of 1,065 inhabitants. Ethnic groups in the village include:

Macedonians 933
Serbs 5
Aromanians 126
Other 1

References

Villages in Štip Municipality